The Annamit myotis (Myotis annamiticus) is a species of mouse-eared bat in the family Vespertilionidae, described in 2001, and indigenous to the Minh Hóa Districton the northern coast of Vietnam. Following its description, investigators succeeded in locating M. annamiticus only in Phong Nha-Kẻ Bàng National Park, and the data regarding the distribution, population, and range of the species is otherwise inadequate to determine its conservation requirements. However it is protected by Phong Nha-Kẻ Bàng National Park.

Taxonomy and etymology
It was described as a new species in 2001.
Thirteen individuals of the new species had been captured in 1999 in the foothills of the Annamite Range, which is the eponym for the species name "annamiticus."

Description
Its fur is short and dense, with its color grayish brown.
Its ventral fur is frosted white at the tip.

Biology and ecology
It echolocates with high-intensity calls that have a maximum energy of 45 kHz.
Females give birth in the spring around the end of April and beginning of May.

Range and habitat
Its range likely includes two countries in Southeast Asia— Laos and Vietnam.

Conservation
As of 2016, it is evaluated as data deficient by the IUCN.

See also
List of mammals of Vietnam

Footnotes

Mammals described in 2001
Mammals of Vietnam
Mouse-eared bats
Bats of Southeast Asia